The 2016 Rugby League Four Nations tournament (known as the 2016 Ladbrokes Four Nations, for sponsorship purposes) was the fifth staging of the Rugby League Four Nations tournament and was played in England in October and November. The series was contested by Australia, England, New Zealand and Scotland, who qualified for their first Four Nations by winning the 2014 European Cup. The final was played on 20 November, with Australia winning its third tournament, defeating New Zealand.

History
The 2016 tournament is the fifth Four Nations series to be planned before the 2017 Rugby League World Cup, with the venues rotating between Europe and the South Pacific.

In addition to automatic inclusions Australia, England and New Zealand, Scotland qualified for the tournament by defeating France in the final of the 2014 European Cup.

England have previously co-hosted tournaments with other European nations and the Rugby Football League (RFL) planned to take a game up into Scotland but backed down and decided to take games to other venues.

The redeveloped 54,074 capacity Anfield Stadium hosted the Four Nations Final. This was the first time in 19 years the venue had held a rugby league match. Three rugby league games have been played at Anfield before. The final was the first ever international rugby league match held at the venue.

Venues 
The games were played at the following venues in England. The tournament final was played at Anfield.

Match officials

Teams

* Denotes winner of tournament event.

Standings 

 By holding New Zealand to an 18–18 draw in the third round, Scotland became the first 'fourth nation' to score a championship point in the history of the tournament.

Results

Round 1

Touch Judges:
 Jack Smith
 Mick Craven
Video Referee:
 Bernard Sutton
Reserve Referee:
 Gerard Sutton

Touch Judges:
 James Child
 Anthony Elliott
Video Referee:
 Bernard Sutton
Reserve Referee:
 Ben Cummins

Round 2

Touch Judges:
 Mick Craven
 Chris Kendall
Video Referee:
 Ben Thaler
Reserve Referee:
 Robert Hicks

Touch Judges:
 Anthony Elliott
 Joe Cobb
Video Referee:
 Bernard Sutton
Reserve Referee:
 Robert Hicks

Round 3

Touch Judges:
 James Child
 Chris Kendall
Video Referee:
 Ben Thaler
Reserve Referee:
 Gerard Sutton

The match was originally scheduled to kick-off at 3:30pm BST, however on 22 September the RFL changed the kick-off time to 2:00pm BST.

Touch Judges:
 Anthony Elliott
 Mick Craven
Video Referee:
 Bernard Sutton
Reserve Referee:
 Ben Cummins

Final

Player statistics

Player of the Tournament
 Cooper Cronk

Pre-tournament matches
Before the series, Australia and New Zealand organised to play the first ever International rugby league test-match in Perth, Scotland took on a Cumbrian rugby league team and England took on France in Avignon.

Australia vs New Zealand

Cumbria Select XIII vs Scotland
The Cumbria Select XIII was a Cumbrian-based team selected by retiring Barrow Raiders player Liam Harrison. The Cumbrian side featured Scottish internationals Oliver Wilkes and Shane Toal.

France vs England

Broadcasting
Premier Sports was the host broadcaster for every match of the tournament.

References

2016
2016 in English rugby league
2016 in Scottish sport
Four Nations
Four Nations
International rugby league competitions hosted by the United Kingdom
October 2016 sports events in the United Kingdom
November 2016 sports events in the United Kingdom